The Embassy of Cuba in London is the diplomatic mission of Cuba in the United Kingdom. The Ambassador is Her Excellency Bárbara Montalvo Álvarez.

Gallery

References

External links
Official site

Cuba
Diplomatic missions of Cuba
Cuba–United Kingdom relations
Buildings and structures in the City of Westminster
St Giles, London